Frederick is a passenger rail station and the northern terminal of the MARC Brunswick Line's Frederick branch, which heads south toward Washington, D.C. This is one of two stations on the Frederick branch. The station is also a major hub for buses of the TransIT Services of Frederick, Maryland.

Frederick Station is located at 100 South East Street, at the south end of the bridge over Carroll Creek in Frederick, Maryland. It was built on December 17, 2001, on the old Frederick Branch of the Baltimore and Ohio Railroad, and was designed to represent some of the original B&O depots of the 19th century. The station is ADA accessible due to a mini-high platform.

Station layout

References

External links
 MARC Train, Maryland Transit Administration
 Frederick MARC Station (TrainWeb)
 Station House from Google Maps Street View

2001 establishments in Maryland
Brunswick Line
Frederick, Maryland
MARC Train stations
Railway stations in the United States opened in 2001
Transportation buildings and structures in Frederick County, Maryland